Estádio Sady Arnildo Schmidt is a multi-use stadium located in Campo Bom, Brazil. It is used mostly for football matches and hosts the home matches of Clube 15 de Novembro. The stadium has a maximum capacity of 3,500 people.

External links
Templos do Futebol

Football venues in Rio Grande do Sul